Tristan Cooke (born 1970), is a British psytrance and Goa trance DJ and producer.

After graduating from Warwick University, he travelled throughout India playing at Full Moon parties in Goa, before returning to the UK in 1993 swiftly establishing his name on the London trance scene at events such as Return to the Source, as well on the emerging outdoor trance party circuit.

Music career
Tristan's debut release was with Matsuri Records in 1995; his first album, Audiodrome, was released by Twisted Records in 1998.

As DJ Tristan, he now performs around the globe at the biggest psytrance festivals, such as Boom and Ozora, as well as other more mainstream dance festivals such as Glastonbury.

Over the years, Tristan has collaborated with many artists from his fellow Warwick alumnus Cassian Irvine to Ans Guise, Tsuyoshi Suzuki, Raja Ram, The Antidote (Serge Souque of Total Eclipse), Ajja, Avalon and Laughing Buddha among others.

Personal life 
Tristan is married to Vanessa née White; the couple have one daughter and divide their time between homes in London and Somerset.

Discography

Albums 
 Audiodrome - Twisted Records, 1999
 Substance - Twisted Records, 2002
 Chemisphere - Nano Records, 2007
 Way of Life - Nano Records, 2014
 Crazy Wisdom - Nano Records, 2022

EP 
 100th Monkey & Tristan - Desert Music E.P Part 1 - Matsuri Productions, 1995
 Close Zen Counters EP - Aquatec Records, 1996
 The F.O.G. EP - 21-3 Records, 1996
 Process - KV 23 EP - Flying Rhino Records, 1996
 Inside Out EP - Twisted Records, 1998
 The Temple EP - Twisted Records, 1999
 The Collaborator EP - Spiral Trax International, 1999
 Fresh Perspective EP - Flying Rhino Records, 2000
 Alpha Activity EP - Twisted Records, 2001
 Identified EP - Tristan vs The Antidote - Nano Records, 2010
 Trance Odyssey EP - Nano Records, 2011
 Force Of Nature by Tristan & Outsiders - Nano Records, 2013
 Road To Dendron EP - Tristan & Mandala - Nano Records, 2018

Compilations 
 Twisted Sessions vol. 1 - Twisted Records, 2002
 Spectrum 2 - Dance Club, 2004
 UK Psychedelic Twisted Records, 2014

See also
 Psychedelia
 Rave

References 

1970 births
Living people
People from Surrey
People educated at Cranleigh School
C
British psychedelic trance musicians
Club DJs
Dance-pop musicians
British DJs
British house musicians
British record producers
British trance musicians
Electro house musicians
Eurodance musicians
Remixers
Progressive house musicians
Electronic dance music DJs
Goa trance musicians